True Colors is an American sitcom television series that aired on Fox from September 2, 1990, to April 12, 1992, for a total of 45 episodes. The series was created by Michael J. Weithorn, and featured an interracial marriage and a subsequent blended family.

Synopsis

Premise and first season
Ronald Freeman (Frankie Faison) is a widowed African-American dentist in Baltimore who marries Ellen Davis (Stephanie Faracy), a divorced white kindergarten teacher who was one of his patients. Ron has two sons from his first marriage, 17-year-old earnest conservative Terry (Claude Brooks) and daydreaming 14-year-old troublemaker Lester (Adam Jeffries); Ellen has a teenage daughter: studious, cause-driven Katie (Brigid Conley Walsh). Ellen's ex-husband Leonard (played in guest appearances by Paul Sand), who is accepting of her second marriage, would occasionally visit her while attempting to get his life back on track. Although the series did focus on race issues, most episodes focused on the family adjusting to their new living situation and the three children going through adolescence.

Second season
In the series' second season, Faison was replaced by Cleavon Little as Ron Freeman. Nancy Walker, who played Ellen’s mother (who lived with the couple despite disapproving of their interracial relationship) was suffering from lung cancer, ultimately only appeared in half the season's episodes due to her treatments and compromised health; she used a motorized wheelchair after she suddenly lost her physical mobility. Terry went off to Marshall State University that fall, not far from home. Ellen accepted a new teaching job at Cortez Junior High, and during the season, she finally realized her long-time talent as a painter. She began to showcase some of her work at local art exhibits, in hopes of launching a new side career. Early in 1992, Robert (Norman D. Golden II) was introduced. Robert, who went by the nickname "Twist", was a young neighbor boy who attached himself to the Freemans, stealing scenes and causing an uproar, usually involving Lester and Terry along the way. Meanwhile, Little looked more and more gaunt during the season; the actor disclosed that he was battling colorectal cancer.

Cancellation and cast deaths
Fox shortened the season order for True Colors by February sweeps and kept the episode total at 21. The new episode that aired on April 12, 1992, wound up being the series' last, as Fox cancelled True Colors one month later. Walker, who had continued working into the winter months until she could no longer do so, died on March 25, 1992, after the series had produced what would be its last episode, but less than a month before the last original episode aired. On October 22, 1992, Little died of cancer.

Cast
 Frankie Faison.....Ronald Freeman (1990–1991)
 Cleavon Little.....Ronald Freeman (1991–1992)
 Stephanie Faracy.....Ellen Davis Freeman 
 Nancy Walker.....Sara Bower
 Brigid Conley Walsh.....Katie Davis
 Claude Brooks.....Terry Freeman
 Adam Jeffries.....Lester Freeman
 Norman D. Golden II....Twist (aka Robert) (1992)

Episode list

Season 1 (1990–91)

Season 2 (1991–92)

Production 
According to the show's creator, he claimed that the theme of interracial romance is one of the last remaining blatant taboos.

References

External links 
 

1990s American black sitcoms
1990s American sitcoms
1990 American television series debuts
1992 American television series endings
English-language television shows
Television shows set in Baltimore
Fox Broadcasting Company original programming
Television series by 20th Century Fox Television
Television series about families
Fiction about interracial romance